This is a list of television programmes that are currently airing or has aired on Super Hungama in India, formerly known as Marvel HQ until 1 March 2022.

Current programming

Animated series
 Bapu
 Guddu
 Beyblade
 Chacha Chaudhary
  Gadget Guru Ganesha
 Kick Buttowski: Suburban Daredevil
 Kiteretsu
 Lego Marvel
 Marvel Super Hero Adventures Miraculous: Tales of Ladybug & Cat Noir Perman Pokémon Supa Strikas The Daltons The Gutsy Frog Ultimate Spider-Man Bola Kampung Iron Man: Armored Adventures Spider-Man (2017 TV series) Live-action Mech-X4 Former programming 
 Buzz Lightyear of Star Command Chacha Bhatija Chai Chai Cingkus Blues Inspector Chingum Milo Murphy's Law Phineas and Ferb Star vs. the Forces of Evil Supa Strikas Upin Ipin Big City Greens''

See also 
 Disney XD India
 Disney Junior India
 Disney Channel India
 List of programmes broadcast by Disney Channel (Indian TV channel)
 List of programmes broadcast by Hungama TV

References

Indian television-related lists
Disney Channel related-lists